The McAlevey Gold Cup was a greyhound racing competition held annually at Celtic Park in Belfast, Northern Ireland. It was introduced in 1938 for greyhounds bred in Ireland and not over two years of age.

The competition was also known as the home-bred produce Stakes and offered a significant winner's prize of £600 in 1946. When the race was won by Dillies Pigalle in 1966 the winning time was a National Record.

The event was not held from 1978 to 1980 due to the temporary closure of Celtic Park. The competition came to an end in 1983 following the permanent closure of Celtic Park.

Past winners

Venues & Distances 
1938-1983 	(Celtic Park, 525y)

References

Greyhound racing competitions in Ireland
Sports competitions in Belfast
Recurring sporting events established in 1938